El Tucuche (936 m) is the second highest peak in Trinidad's Northern Range and is noted for its interesting pyramidal shape. It is fabled in Amerindian lore as a sacred mountain. There are Amerindian petroglyphs on a rock outcrop below the mountain. These are the only petroglyphs in country known to archaeologists.

Its summit is home to the golden tree frog (Phytotriades auratus). On the summit of El Tucuche, elfin woodland can be found. The vegetation is usually gnarled and short, due to the high elevation, exposure to clouds and prevailing winds. At the foot of the mountain lies the village of Lluengo, home to approximately 2,000 residents.

Wildlife on El Tucuche includes animals such as the El Tucuche Golden Tree Frog (Phytotriades auratus), the Red Brocket Deer, the Fer-de-lance (Bothrops atrox), the Bearded Bellbird, the Orange-winged Amazon Parrot, the White-bearded Manakin, the Trinidad Stream Frog (Mannophryne trinitatis) and the Emperor Morpho Butterfly (Morpho peleides) to name just a few. Notable vegetation on the higher slopes includes mosses, tree-ferns and bromeliads (including Glomeropitcairnia erectiflora - the microhabitat of the El Tucuche Golden Tree Frog); and Heliconias on the lower to middle slopes. Old abandoned Cocoa estates that are reverting to forest occur in some areas of the lower slopes.

El Tucuche is often climbed by hikers. There are two summits, the first summit ascends to above  and displays a 1000 feet sheer-vertical cliff. When clouds aren't present, the nation's capital, Port Of Spain, the Caroni Swamp and Main Ridge can be viewed from the summit. The mountain also has views of Maracas Beach.

See also
 El Cerro del Aripo

References

Mountains of Trinidad and Tobago
Trinidad (island)